Grażyna Gęsicka (13 December 1951 – 10 April 2010) was a Polish sociologist and politician and a former (2006 - 2007) minister of Regional Development in Marcinkiewicz's and Jarosław Kaczyński's government. From 2009 until her death she was the leader of Law and Justice parliamentary caucus.

She was born in Warsaw. In 1974 she graduated from Warsaw University's Institute of Sociology and in 1985 received her doctorate.

She was a former member of the Polish Sociological Society and the Association Internationale des Sociologues de Langue Francaise.

She was a speaker of English and French.

She was listed on the flight manifest of the Tupolev Tu-154 of the 36th Special Aviation Regiment carrying the President of Poland Lech Kaczyński which crashed near Smolensk-North airport near Pechersk near Smolensk, Russia, on 10 April 2010, killing all aboard. On 25 April, she was buried in the Smolensk Cemetery Headquarters Military Cemetery in Warsaw.

On 16 April 2010, Gęsicka was posthumously awarded the Commander's Cross of the Order of Polonia Restituta.

References

1951 births
2010 deaths
Burials at Powązki Military Cemetery
Writers from Warsaw
Politicians from Warsaw
Polish sociologists
Polish women sociologists
Commanders of the Order of Polonia Restituta
Victims of the Smolensk air disaster
Women government ministers of Poland
University of Warsaw alumni
Government ministers of Poland
Members of the Polish Sejm 2007–2011
21st-century Polish women politicians